Om, stylized as ॐ, is a 1995 Indian Kannada-language action crime film written and directed by Upendra. The film was produced by Parvathamma Rajkumar under the production company Sri Vajreshwari Combines. The film stars Shiva Rajkumar and Prema with Srishanthi, G. V. Shivanand, Sadhu Kokila in supporting roles  with real-life gangsters -  Bekkina Kannu Rajendra, Tanveer, Korangu Krishna and Jedaralli Krishnappa - portraying the role of gangsters in a small but important portion of the movie.

The film was notable for its exposure of Bangalore's criminal underworld. The film's plot revolves around Satya, son of a priest who becomes a gangster after his lover framed him in a murder. The rest of the film is about Satya leaving the rowdyism. The soundtrack was composed by Hamsalekha who also wrote the lyrics for all songs. B. C. Gowrishankar and Shashikumar handled cinematography and editing respectively.

Om was remade in Telugu as Omkaram (1997) starring Dr.Rajshekar and Prema which was also directed by Upendra. Hamsalekha was also the music director of the Telugu remake and retained the songs from this movie in the Telugu version. The movie was unofficially remade in Hindi as Arjun Pandit. UP gangster Vikas Dubey was reported to be an ardent fan of Arjun Pandit. 

The movie which was made under a budget of around 70 lakhs was the costliest film for Dr.Raj banner at that time. It made a pre-release business of around 2 crores. The film became a successful venture at the box office and was declared an industry hit. It remains a cult classic film in Kannada cinema with a dedicated fan following among audience owing to its re-release every two weeks. This film has a Limca record for re-releasing more than 550 times. The movie was reported to be the highest screened film in the history of Kannada cinema.
The movie has released 30 times in Kapali theatre, Bangalore which is a record. On the occasion of completion of 25 years, Upendra had revealed that the core plot of the movie was based on a real-life person - Purshi who was his brother's friend. The movie is credited for ushering in the genre of underworld mafia in a full-fledged manner in Kannada cinema.

Plot
Shashi is a journalist who interviews underworld gangsters and provides a book titled ॐ, which is written by her and request them to read. In the book, Shashi, who was interviewing about the Bangalore Underworld learns about a gangster named Satyamurthy "Satya" Shastri, who has been forcing a college student named Madhuri "Madhu" to love him by day, but is also involved in oil smuggling activities by Oil Raja at night. One night, Satya meets another gangster named Rayan where he reveals that Raja has hired an hitman named Kutty to kill him. Satya stabs Kutty, but manages to survive despite being severely injured and also kills Oil Raja at his mansion, where his wife Maria becomes the eyewitness. After being provided by an iota that he will be waiting for Madhuri at his friend Geetha's house, by Shashi. The cops chases Satya, but manages to escape, leaving Madhu. Shashi learns about Satya's past from Geetha: 

Satya was a humble college student and the son of a brahmin priest named Sreekantha Shastri, who is leading a happy life with his mother and three sisters: Sujatha, Suma and Gowri. At his house, Satya is visited by Dheena's brother Ponna, who wants to stay away from Madhu, whom Dheena is in love with. Madhu is attracted to Satya and keeps talking to him, where Satya falls in love with Madhu, who instill courage to fight back. At the college, Satya hacks Dheena and Ponna, who survives with severe injuries. Madhu testifies that Satya hacked the brothers for personal vengeance where he is tortured in police custody, but is granted bail by Ponna's boss Jayaraj. Satya visits Madhu where he learns that she is his friend Harish's sister. In a past event, Satya and Harish witnessed the killing of a girl by Ponna. Ponna and his gang frame Harish for the murder and threaten to black mail Satya if he doesn't testify against Harish.

Satya is reluctant, but is forced to lie at the court that Harish is the murderer by his family. Distraught, Harish commits suicide in jail. Subsequently, Harish's and Madhu's mother dies from shock. Madhu planned vengeance against Ponna where she used Satya as a weapon to kill Ponna while also tarnishing Satya's life. Satya is also ousted by his father Sreekantha Shastri, where he joins hands with Jayaraj. In the present, Satya takes Madhu to propose to her, but Madhu stabs Satya and escapes. However, Satya arrives at Madhu's house alive where he takes Shashi to a room and quietly ask her to help him convince Madhu of his innocence. Shashi agrees, where the two orchestrate a drama and makes Madhu realize her mistake. Having seen Satya's family's condition, Madhu feels guilty and decides to change Satya to his past self. Meanwhile, Kutty and Ponna brainwash Rayan against Satya, leading to a gang war at the former's sister's wedding, but Satya executes the henchmen in front of his family. 

When the cops arrive, Madhu takes Satya and escape, but Satya's sister alliance is broken due to Satya's actions. Sreekantha Shastri performs a funeral, claiming that Satya is dead, which leads Satya heartbroken. Madhu tries to console Satya where she profess her love for him, and tells Satya to be his normal self, and she also tells about Rayan's involvement in the attack. Enraged and ignorant of Madhu, Satya attacks Rayan at a restaurant but Rayan escapes. Madhu begins fasting till Satya changes his ways. Satya learns about Kutty's release from prison and his involvement in the death of Jayaraj and his gang members, so he hacks him to death at night. Madhu is admitted to the hospital where Satya meets her, but Rayan and his henchmen also arrive at the hospital. At this point in the film, the book's ending pages are missing, so the gangsters contact Shashi to know about the ending. 

Shashi takes them to a dhaba, where she reveals what happened at the hospital. At the hospital, Satya tells the gangsters to finish him, and he also promises Madhu that he will lead a life free from the underworld. After making the promise, Satya's leg is chopped and Madhu's face is half-burnt by the acid thrown by one of the goons. Rayan and the others realize that Satya has changed, so they leave him to start a new life. It is revealed that Shashi brought them to Satya, who is a changed man, running a dhaba and leading a happy life with Madhu and his children. After seeing the happiness of Satya and his family, the gangsters realize their mistake and retire from the underworld to live a peaceful life with their families, with the film ends with a message on peace.

Cast

 Shiva Rajkumar as Satyamurthy     "Satya" Shastri
 Prema as Madhuri "Madhu"
 Srishanthi as Shashi, a journalist of Krantiveera
 G. V. Shivanand as Narasimha, Madhu's father
 Upasane Seetharam as Sreekantha Shastri, Satya's father
 Honnavalli Krishna as a press photographer in Krantiveera
 Sadhu Kokila as Shankar
 V. Manohar as Chennakeshava, Editor-in-chief of Krantiveera
 Vanishree as Sujatha, Satya's sister
 Sandhya as Suma, Sathya's sister 
 Michael Madhu as Michael 
 Bekkina Kannu Rajendra as himself
 Tanveer as himself
 Korangu Krishna as himself
 Jedaralli Krishnappa as himself
 Ajay as "Srirampura" Kutty
 Dileep as Jai
 S. Murali Mohan as Harish, Madhuri's brother 
 Harish Rai as Don Roy 
 Kote Prabhakar as Dheena, Ponna's brother
 Tumkur Mohan as Ponna, Dheena's brother
 Vikram Udayakumar as Inspector 
 Sriraksha Shivakumar as Geetha, Madhu's friend
 Balu Murugaraj
 Sriraj Kothari 
 John 
 Sukumar
 Shankar Narayan
 Ashwath Narayan
 N. Lokanath
 Mysore Anand 
 Suresh Rai

Production

Development
Speaking on a talk show, Weekend with Ramesh in 2014, on how he developed the story for Om, Upendra said he wrote a part of the story during his days in college in the late-1980s. Purushottam, a friend of Upendra, brought to him a letter written by someone that caught his attention. Drawing inspiration from it, he drafted the first part of the story, that he subsequently developed, although incompletely. He also revealed that had always wanted make a film on organized crime and mafia, based on real-life incidents. He said he was "disappointed" on learning that the screenplay of 1989 film Siva had a similar storyline to what he had written. He began working as a dialogue writer and songwriter in Kannada cinema during the time, and the first half of the 1990s saw him direct two films, Tharle Nan Maga (1992) and Shhh! (1993). Alongside, he developed the storyline and wrote a screenplay with the plot taking sequences of flashback, which he said "took another form" at the end of completion.

Casting
Having given the film a working title as Satya, Upendra initially decided to cast Kumar Govind as the eponymous lead, who he had previously collaborated with, in Shhh!. However, later, eager to cast Shiva Rajkumar in the role, Upendra approached actor Honnavalli Krishna in 1994, and persuaded him to speak the matter over to Shiva's father and actor, Rajkumar. Krishna spoke to S. P. Varadappa, Rajkumar's brother, who invited Upendra and him over to their house in Bangalore. Impressed by the story narrated by Upendra in a span of ten minutes using newspaper cuttings of oil mafia to elaborate on the subject, Rajkumar gave the go-ahead and Shiva was signed as the male lead. Rajkumar also agreed to produce the film and handed an amount of 50,000 over to Upendra the same day. Shiva had till then portrayed roles predominantly of a romantic hero in his then career of 8 years. Speaking on casting him, Upendra said he was drawn by Shiva's "powerful brownish-shaded eyes" and wanted to "make full use of it". Many actresses had been speculated to play the role of the female lead Madhuri, in the film, including then popular Hindi film actress Juhi Chawla. Finally, on Rajkumar's approval, Prema, a newcomer then, who was already filming with Shiva in Savyasachi, was cast in the role. Real-life gangsters Bekkinakannu Rajendra, Korangu Krishna, Tanveer Ahmad and Jedarahalli Krishna made cameo appearances in the film.

Filming
The principal photography began on 7 December 1994 in Bangalore. On the day, Rajkumar wrote the spiritual icon "ॐ" on the film's screenplay material using kumkuma, which was later made the title design for the film. B. C. Gowrishankar who handled cinematography used a warm, yellow tone and employed filters throughout the film to diffuse the violence and the colour of the blood.

Soundtrack

Hamsalekha composed the film score and the film's soundtrack, also writing its lyrics. In September 2015, the rights for the soundtrack album was acquired by Sony Music Entertainment, and was released digitally. All the songs including Hey Dinakara and O Gulabiye were well received and became chartbusters.

Release
The film was made on a budget of 68 lakh rupees.H. D. Kumaraswamy bought the rights to distribute the film for the Mysore area and made a small fortune. Bangalore area was distributed by regular Telugu film distributor in Karnataka G.Venkatpathy.

Re release
The movie crossed its 500th re - release mark in 2013.
As of March 2015, Om had been re-released over 550 times and in over 400 theatres across Karnataka. On 12 March 2015, the film was re-released with Digital intermediate and DTS for the first time in over 100 theatres. It was distributed by Kishore Films.

Home Media
Even though the film was released in 1995, its satellite rights was sold to Udaya TV in 2015 for a sum of 10 crores. The film had its television premiere on 15 August 2015 on the eve of Independence Day. The amount is the highest for any Kannada film considering that the film is already 20 years old and has been released hundreds of times. Video rights was released by Sri Ganesh Video.

Awards
1995–96 Karnataka State Film Awards
 Best Actor — Shiva Rajkumar
 Best Actress — Prema
 Best Screenplay — Upendra
 Best Cinematographer — B. C. Gowrishankar

43rd South Filmfare Awards
 Best Actor — Shiva Rajkumar

Legacy
Om attained cult status in Kannada cinema. It became a trendsetter in the genre of films based on gangsters. Rediff in its review of Darshan starrer Shastri (2005) called it "poor imitation of the trendsetting Kannada film, Om". Murali Mohan who worked as an assistant in Om made his directorial debut with Santha (2007) which had a similar plot.

In 1999, the film was unofficially remade in Hindi as Arjun Pandit (1999) by Rahul Rawail which stars Sunny Deol and Juhi Chawla in leading roles was criticized by film viewers for deviating from the storyline.

References

External links
 

1995 films
Films set in Bangalore
Indian crime action films
Films about organised crime in India
Films scored by Hamsalekha
Kannada films remade in other languages
Indian gangster films
1990s crime action films
1990s Kannada-language films
Films directed by Upendra
Films shot in Bangalore
Indian action drama films
Indian nonlinear narrative films
Indian crime drama films
1995 crime drama films
1990s action drama films